Märsta is a railway station located in Märsta in Sigtuna Municipality, Stockholm County, Sweden. The station is located 36.5km north of Stockholm C, on the Swedish East Coast Line (Swedish: Ostkustbanan). The station serves long-distance and regional SJ trains, and since 1968 has also been a northern terminus for Stockholm's commuter trains. The station opened in 1876, ten years after the inauguration of the Stockholm-Uppsala railway line. The current station building was built in 1914 and, but severely in a fire in May 2000. Demolition was first considered but it was then decided that the building would be rebuilt.

Long Distance Train Station 
The older part of the station serves SJ Regional Trains, and consists of a platform with two through-tracks.  The tracks to Stockholm were doubled in 1906, followed by the tracks to Uppsala in 1908, and line was electrified in 1934. Long-distance traffic decreased at Märsta Station when the Arlanda line was put into use in 1999.

Commuter Train Station 
The commuter rail part of the station was built in autumn 1968, when Storstockholms Lokaltrafik (SL) took over responsibility for local rail transport within Stockholm County. It consists of a central platform with two tracks. A ticket hall and waiting area are located on the northern part of the platform. It is a terminus station, and the entrance is at-grade with the street outside. The station has just over 7,300 boarders on weekdays (2019) on the commuter trains. In addition, the bus terminal has approximately 8,100 boarding passengers per weekday. Many people take a bus from Märsta Station to Arlanda Airport to avoid paying the surcharge to use Arlanda Central Station on the privatised Arlanda Line.

Redevelopment Plans 
In connection with the 2014 Swedish general election, both the Social Democrat and Moderate parties declared that Märsta station should be rebuilt. As of 2021, the Swedish Transport Administration is investigating and planning for a rebuilding of the station. Plans for the station include the reconstruction of Märsta railway yard, new entrances and platforms, expanded passenger waiting areas, and better accessibility between SL and SJ trains.

Gallery

Historic Photos

Station Building

Long Distance Train Area

Commuter Train Area

References 

1878 establishments in Sweden
Sigtuna Municipality
Railway stations in Stockholm County
Railway stations opened in 1878